Stenotrema hirsutum, common name hairy slitmouth, is a species of air-breathing land snail, a terrestrial pulmonate gastropod mollusk in the family Polygyridae.

References

External links 

Polygyridae
Gastropods described in 1817